The Scandinavian Collectors Club is a United States-based philatelic society dedicated to the collection and study of the postage stamps and postal history of the Scandinavia region, including the geographical regions of Åland, Aunus, the Danish West Indies, Denmark, Faroe Islands, Finland, Greenland, Iceland, Karelia, North Ingermanland, Norway, Slesvig, and Sweden.

History 
The club was founded in 1935 in New York City as the Finnish-American Stamp Club. On February 13, 1942, the club changed its name to the Scandinavian Collectors Club of New York, and, in 1959, it changed its name again to Scandinavian Collectors Club and chapters were formed. On April 26, 1960, the club was incorporated in the state of Illinois and operated in the Chicago, Illinois, area. The society decided to broaden its appeal internationally, and re-incorporated in the state of Delaware.

Membership
Membership is open to all collectors and students of Scandinavian philately.

Chapters
In addition to being centralized in the Chicago area, the club has formed various local chapters to serve the needs of collectors nationally and internationally. Chapters are located in various places, including Seattle; Chicago; New England; New York City; Northern New Jersey; Reykjavik, Iceland; Washington, D.C.; Delaware; Minneapolis, Minnesota; California; Houston, Texas; Manitoba, Canada; Virginia; and, Colorado.

Services
The organization conducts meetings, study groups, provides library services, a Scandinavian stamp mart, and provides exhibition judges as well as providing information for members related to upcoming philatelic exhibitions.

The Posthorn
The society issues its own journal, entitled The Posthorn. The journal has been in continuous publication since 1943, and is published quarterly.

By-laws
The club is governed by a set of by-laws which state its primary purpose is to "promote fellowship and communication among collectors of Scandinavian philatelic material." The organization is governed by eleven elected officers, a president,  2 vice presidents, secretary, treasurer and 6 directors.

See also
 Scandinavia philatelic society
 Stamp collecting

References
 Scandinavian Collectors Club

Philatelic organizations based in the United States
Philately of Greenland
Philately of Finland
Philately of Denmark
Philately of Sweden
Philately of Norway
Philately of the Faroe Islands
Philately of Iceland
Organizations established in 1935
1935 establishments in New York City